Avanashi block is a revenue block in the Tiruppur district of Tamil Nadu, India. It has a total of 31 panchayat villages.

References 
 

Revenue blocks of Tiruppur district